Sir Thomas Boughey Academy (formerly Sir Thomas Boughey High School) is a co-educational secondary school located in Halmer End (near Newcastle-under-Lyme) in Staffordshire, England.

The school is named after Sir Thomas Boughey of the Boughey baronets who donated land for the establishment of the school. The school can trace its origins to 1849.

Today it is an academy administered by the United Endeavour Trust. The school offers GCSEs as programmes of study for pupils. The school was rated GOOD in the 2022 OFSTED inspection

Notable pupils
Aaron Ramsdale, footballer

References

External links
Sir Thomas Boughey Academy official website

Educational institutions established in 1849
1849 establishments in England
Secondary schools in Staffordshire
Academies in Staffordshire